The Arboretum of the Barnes Foundation (5 ha / 12 acres) is an arboretum and the former site of the Barnes Foundation art gallery located at 300 North Latch's Lane, Merion, Pennsylvania, with entrance at 50 Lapsley Lane. Since 2018 the adjacent Saint Joseph's University has managed the arboretum and its educational programs under a lease agreement with the foundation. Now known as the Barnes Arboretum at Saint Joseph's University, the arboretum is open to visitors Monday through Friday when the university is open, but for walk-in visitors only. From May through the end of October, the arboretum is open Saturday and Sunday from 11 a.m. to 4 p.m. with free parking in their lot. Admission is free and no tickets or reservations required.

The arboretum was begun in the 1880s by Captain Joseph Lapsley Wilson. The site was purchased by the Barnes Foundation in 1922, whereupon Wilson became the arboretum's director and a foundation trustee until his death in 1928. Over time, the arboretum has expanded its collection to over 3,000 species/varieties of woody plants, a herbarium housing 10,000 specimens, and a library of some 2,500 volumes. The arboretum school was established in 1940.

The arboretum contains good collections of Aesculus, Cotoneaster, Cornus, crab apples,  ornamental ferns, lilac, Lonicera, Magnolia, peony, Quercus, Phellodendron, Rhododendron, Stewartia, and Viburnum, as well as notable specimens of Ginkgo biloba, Calocedrus decurrens, Cunninghamia lanceolata, Sequoia sempervirens, and Trochodendron aralioides. Other plants of interest include Araucaria araucana, Davidia involucrata, andParrotia persica''.

It also contains a formal rose and perennial garden, woodland, lawns, pond, stream, and a greenhouse (reconstructed in 2002) containing about 250 varieties of plants.

See also 
 Barnes Foundation
 List of botanical gardens in the United States

External links 

 

Barnes Foundation Arboretum
Barnes Foundation Arboretum
Barnes Foundation Arboretum
Parks in Montgomery County, Pennsylvania